Johnson City Southern Railway Company was a railway company incorporated in 1905 "in North Carolina to build a railroad from Marion, North Carolina, to the Tennessee state line".

References

North Carolina railroads
Railway companies established in 1905
Johnson City, Tennessee
Marion, North Carolina